Friedrich Kaiser (3 April 1814, Biberach - 6 November 1874, Vienna) was an Austrian playwright.  During his youth he was one of the most popular people in Vienna.  Some of his plays were "Hans Hasenkopf" (1835); "Wer wird Amtmann" (1840), "Palais und Irrenhaus" (1863), "Des Krämers Töchterlein" (1862), "Pater Abraham a Sancta Clara" as well as many others.  He also wrote the historical novel "Ein Plaffenfeben."

References 

1814 births
1874 deaths
People from Biberach an der Riss
People from the Kingdom of Württemberg
Austrian male dramatists and playwrights
19th-century Austrian male writers
19th-century Austrian dramatists and playwrights